Pope Martin V (January/February 1369 – 20 February 1431), born Otto (or Oddone) Colonna, was the head of the Catholic Church and ruler of the Papal States from 11 November 1417 to his death in February 1431. His election effectively ended the Western Schism of 1378–1417. He is the last pope to date to take on the pontifical name "Martin".

Biography
Oddone Colonna was born at Genazzano, the son of Agapito Colonna and Caterina Conti, between 26 January and 20 February, 1369. He belonged to one of the oldest and most distinguished families of Rome. His brother Giordano became Prince of Salerno and Duke of Venosa, while his sister Paola was Lady of Piombino between 1441 and 1445.

Oddone studied law at the University of Pavia. He became apostolic protonotary under Pope Urban VI (1378–1389), and was created Cardinal-Deacon of San Giorgio in Velabro by Pope Innocent VII in 1405.

In 1409 he took part in the Council of Pisa, and was one of the supporters of Antipope Alexander V. Later he confirmed his allegiance to Alexander's successor, John XXIII, by whom his family obtained several privileges, while Oddone obtained for himself the vicariate of Todi, Orvieto, Perugia and Umbria. He was excommunicated for this in 1411 by Pope Gregory XII. Oddone was with John XXIII's entourage at the Council of Constance and followed him in his escape at Schaffhausen on 21 March 1415. Later he returned to Constance and took part in the process leading to the deposition of John XXIII.

Papacy

Election
After deposing Antipope John XXIII in 1415, the Council of Constance was long divided by the conflicting claims of Pope Gregory XII (1406–15) and Antipope Benedict XIII (1394–1423). Martin was elected pope, at the age of 48,  at the Council of Constance on St. Martin's Day, 11 November 1417. Participants in the conclave included 23 cardinals and 30 delegates of the council. He was ordained a priest on 13 November, 1417, and consecrated bishop the next day.

Martin left Constance at the close of the council (May 1418), but travelled slowly through Italy and lingered at Florence. His authority in Rome was represented by his brother Giordano, who had fought under Muzio Attendolo against the condottiero Braccio da Montone. The Pope at the time ruled only Rome (when not rebellious) and its environs: Braccio held Umbria, Bologna as an independent commune, while much of Romagna and the Marche was held by local "vicars", who were in fact petty hereditary lords. In particular, Martin confirmed Giorgio Ordelaffi in Forlì, Ludovico Alidosi in Imola, Malatesta IV Malatesta in Rimini, and Guidantonio da Montefeltro in Spoleto, who would later marry the pope's niece Caterina Colonna. 

In exchange for the recognition of Joan II of Naples, Martin obtained the restitution of Benevento, several fiefs in the Kingdom of Naples for his relatives and, most important of all, an agreement that Muzio Attendolo, then hired by the Neapolitans, should leave Rome.

After a long stay in Florence while these matters were arranged, Martin was able to enter Rome in September 1420. He at once set to work establishing order and restoring the dilapidated churches, palaces, bridges, and other public structures. For this reconstruction he engaged some famous masters of the Tuscan school and helped instigate the Roman Renaissance.

Faced with competing plans for general reform offered by various nations, Martin V submitted a counter-scheme and entered into negotiations for separate concordats, for the most part vague and illusory, with the Holy Roman Empire, England, France and Spain.

Hussite Wars
By 1415 Bohemia was in turmoil and the subject of much discussion at the Council of Constance. Adherents of Jan Hus, who had been previously burned at the stake as a heretic by the Council, adopted the practice of Communion under both kinds. The Council sent letters to the civil and ecclesiastical authorities in Bohemia, insisting they deal with the heresy. Bohemian and Moravian nobles responded that the sentence on Hus was unjust and insulting to their country, and promised to protect priests against episcopal prosecutions for heresy. Prague was placed under interdict for sheltering the excommunicated Jan of Jesenice. Beghards arrived attracted by Bohemia's reputation for religious liberty.

In 1419 King Wenceslaus IV, who had resisted what he considered interference in his kingdom, commanded that all ejected Catholic beneficiaries should be reinstated in their offices and revenues. Prague prepared for armed resistance. Jan Želivský, an extreme anti-Catholic preacher of Prague, led a procession to the town hall, where under the leadership of Jan Žižka of Trocnov, a noble of southern Bohemia, the building was stormed and people found inside were thrown out of the windows on to the spears and swords of the processionists, and hacked to pieces. In Kuttenberg, hundreds of captured Hussites were thrown by the miners into the shafts of disused silver mines. King Wenceslaus swore death to all the rebels, but died of a stroke in August, 1419. The next months were marked by deeds of violence; many citizens, especially Germans, had to flee.

Wenceslaus was succeeded by his brother Sigismund, King of the Romans and King of Hungary, who prepared to restore order. On 1 March 1420, Pope Martin V issued a Bull inviting all Christians to unite in a crusade against the Wycliffites (Lollards), Hussites, and other heretics. The crusades were, however, ultimately unsuccessful.

Crusades
According to Burton, Pope Martin authorized a crusade against Africa in 1418 in relation to the slave trade.

In addition to the Hussite Crusades, Martin declared a Crusade against the Ottoman Empire in 1420 in response to the rising pressure from the Ottoman Turks. In 1419–1420 Martin had diplomatic contacts with the Byzantine emperor Manuel II, who was invoking a council in Constantinople. On 12 July 1420 the Pope conceded to attach an indulgence to anyone who would contribute to a crusade against the latter, which would be led by Sigismund, King of the Romans.

War against Braccio da Montone
The main concern of Martin's pontificate from 1423 was the resumed war against Braccio da Montone. The following year, the combined Papal-Neapolitan army, led by Giacomo Caldora and Francesco Sforza, defeated him at the Battle of L'Aquila (2 June 1424); Braccio died a few days later.

In the same year Martin obtained a reduction of the autonomy of the commune of Bologna, whose finances would be thenceforth under the authority of a papal treasurer. He also ended the war with Braccio da Montone in exchange for his recognition as vicar and reconciled with the deposed John XXIII, to whom he gave the title of Cardinal of Tusculum.

Annuity contracts
Canon law prohibited interest upon a loan. To avoid this, annuities were paid, interest in effect but not in name. The dispute as to the legality of annuity contracts was brought before Martin V in 1423. He held that purchased annuities, which were redeemable at the option of the seller, were lawful. When the lawfulness of annuities was established, they were widely used in commerce; it seems that city states used them to raise compulsory loans from their citizens.

Periodic ecumenical councils
A decree of the Council of Constance ordered that councils should be held every five years. Martin V summoned a council in 1423 that met first at Pavia and later at Siena (the "Council of Siena"). It was rather poorly attended, which gave the Pope a pretext for dissolving it, as soon as it had come to the resolution that "internal church union by reform ought to take precedence over external union". It was prorogued for seven years. The seventeenth council then met as the "Council of Basel" in February 1431 shortly before Martin's death.

Death
Martin V died in Rome of a stroke on 20 February 1431 at the age of 62. He is buried at St. John Lateran Basilica.

Personal views

Position on Jews
The excitement of the Church during the Hussite movement rendered the Jews apprehensive, and through Emperor Sigismund, they obtained from Pope Martin V various bulls (1418 and 1422) in which their former privileges were confirmed and in which he exhorted the friars to use moderate language. In the last years of his pontificate, however, he repealed several of his ordinances. A gathering, convoked by the Jews in Forlì, sent a deputation asking Pope Martin V to abolish the oppressive laws promulgated by Antipope Benedict XIII. The deputation succeeded in its mission.

Position on slavery
 
During the Middle Ages, slavery had fallen out of usage in Europe. The Church denounced the enslavement of Christians. However, voyages and discoveries brought other continents, where slavery still existed, into European consciousness, raising the question of whether slavery of unbelievers and outside of Europe was permitted. According to Burton, Martin authorized a crusade against Africa in 1418, and this, coupled with a later bull of Pope Eugene IV (1441), sanctioned the Portuguese trade in African slaves.  In March 1425 a bull was issued that threatened excommunication for any dealers in Christian slave  and ordered Jews to wear a "badge of infamy" to deter, in part, the buying of Christians. In June 1425 Martin anathematized those who sold Christian slaves to Muslims. Traffic in Christian slaves was not banned, purely the sale to non-Christian owners. The papal bull of excommunication issued to the Genoese merchants of Caffa related to the buying and selling of Christians, but has been considered ineffectual as prior injunctions against the Viennese, including the Laws of Gazaria, made allowances for the sale of both Christian and Muslim slaves. Ten black African slaves were presented to Martin by Prince Henry of Portugal. According to Koschorke, Martin supported colonial expansion. Davidson (1961) argues that Martin's injunction against slavery was not a condemnation of slavery itself, but rather driven through fear of "infidel power".

Norman Housley finds it "...hard to avoid the conclusion that the pope was agreeing to whatever was asked of him by the king.... [P]olitical weakness compelled the Renaissance Papacy to adopt an acquiescent and unchallenging position when approached for requests for privileges in favour of these ventures."

Residences
During his permanence in Rome, Martin moved his residence from the Lateran to Santa Maria Maggiore and, from 1424, the Basilica of Santi Apostoli near the Palazzo Colonna. He also frequently sojourned in towns held by his family in the Latium (Tivoli, Vicovaro, Marino, Gallicano and others).

Numbering
When the second Pope to take the name Martin was elected in 1281, there was confusion over how many Popes had taken the name before. It was believed then that there were three, so the new Pope of 1281 became Martin IV. But, in reality, those believed to be Martin II and Martin III were actually named Marinus I and Marinus II, although they are sometimes still referred to as "Martin II" and "Martin III". This has advanced the numbering of all subsequent Popes Martin by two. Popes Martin IV–V were actually the second and third popes by that name.

See also

List of popes

Notes

References
 
  Review
 
 
 
 

1369 births
1431 deaths
People from Genazzano
Popes
Italian popes
University of Pavia alumni
Cardinal-bishops of Palestrina
15th-century Italian Roman Catholic bishops
People of the Hussite Wars
Western Schism
Colonna family
Renaissance Papacy
People temporarily excommunicated by the Catholic Church
15th-century popes
15th-century Italian cardinals
Burials at the Archbasilica of Saint John Lateran